Samurai Math Beats is a studio album by Bogdan Raczynski. It was released on Rephlex Records in 1999.

In 2014, "Samurai Masu Bitsu" ranked at number 29 on Facts "100 Greatest IDM Tracks" list.

Track listing

Translations
Translations of applicable track names are listed below.

References

External links
 

1999 albums
Bogdan Raczynski albums
Rephlex Records albums